Roger Olmos Pastor is a Spanish illustrator.

Education and career
Born in Barcelona on December 23, 1975, Roger Olmos became interested in the world of illustration from a very young age, when he started spending time in his father's studio at home where he watched him drawing and painting. There he got fascinated by authors such as Brad Holland, Caza and Brian Froud.

After attending the Llotja Avinyò School of Arts and Crafts in Barcelona from 1995 to 2000, he started a six-year apprenticeship as a scientific illustrator at the Dexeus Clinic in Barcelona, during which he learned a lot about textures and anatomy.

With time, however, he decided to turn to children's books. In 1999 he met his first publisher, Kalandraka, at the Bologna Children's Book Fair, with which he would publish his first book (Tío Lobo) the following year.

Since then he has illustrated more than eighty books for many Spanish and international publishers such as: Edelvives, Penguin Random House, Macmillan, Kalandraka, Oqo Editora, Ediciones B, La Galera, Teide, Anaya, Edebé, Planeta, Baula, #logosedizioni, Melhoramentos, Bromera, Editions 62, Pirouette etc.

He is a vegan and an animal-rights activist, and he actively collaborates with FAADA (Foundation for the Counselling and Action in Defense of Animals, based in Barcelona). This collaboration led to the publication of two books, both published by #logosedizioni (Italy): Sinpalabras / Senzaparole (Wordless) in 2014, praised by the like of Jane Goodall and J.M. Coetzee, and which Roger has described as “one of the most important and personal books of my career”, and Amigos in 2017.

He also collaborates with various advertising agencies, illustration schools and TV channels.

Prizes and awards
 1999, 2002 and 2005: selected for the Illustrator's Exhibition at the Bologna Children's Book Fair
 2002: White Ravens Selection by the International Youth Library (Tío Lobo, kalandraka)
 2004: White Ravens Selection by the International Youth Library (El Libro de las Fábulas, Ediciones B)
 2006: White Ravens Special Mention (La cosa que más duele del mundo / The Thing That Hurts Most in the World, OQO)
 2006: Premio Llibreter de Álbum Ilustrado (La cosa que más duele del mundo / The Thing That Hurts Most in the World, OQO)
 2008: Premio Lazarillo de Álbum Ilustrado (El príncipe de los enredos, Edelvives)
2013: Premio Hospital Sant Joan de Déu (La màquina de pessigoles, la Galera)
 2014: Best illustrated book for children, by the Spanish Ministry of Culture (Régalame un beso, Penguin Random House Mondadori)
 2015: Best illustrated book for children, by the Spanish Ministry of Culture (La leyenda de Zum, Nubeocho ediciones)
2015: Premio 400Colpi, Torredilibri (Senzaparole, #logosedizioni)
 2017: Selected as one of the most representative illustrators in Catalonia, Guest of Honour at the Bologna Children's Book Fair 2017 together with the Balearic Islands

Solo exhibitions (selection) 
 2014 Pequeños catálogo de instantes de felicidad – Barberà del Vallès
 2014 Senzaparole – Biblioteca Delfini, Modena
 2014 Sinpalabras – Panta Rhei, Madrid
2015 Sinpalabras – AnimaNaturalis, Barcelona
2015, Roger Olmos. Illustrator – Kinderboekenmarkt, Den Haag
 2016 Cosimo. Open air exhibition – via dell’Indipendenza and via San Giuseppe, Bologna (CHEAP – urban art festival, in collaboration with #logosedizioni)
 2016 Cosimo. Original artworks exhibition – Family Palace, Lucca Comics & Games, Lucca, Italy
 2017 Amigos. Open air exhibition – via dell’Abbadia, Bologna (CHEAP – urban art festival, in collaboration with #logosedizioni)
 2017 Cosimo – Mirabilia Art Gallery, Bologna, Italy
 2018 Lucia. Open air exhibition – via dell’Indipendenza, Bologna (CHEAP – urban art festival, in collaboration with #logosedizioni and CBM Italia Onlus)
 2018 Lucia – Mirabilia Art Gallery, Bologna
2018 Lucia – Premio letterario Giuseppe Dessì, Ex Mulino Cadoni, Villacidro
2019 Un poquito de media vida – LAVA, Valladolid
2019 Ilustrando la mala suerte – Fundación BilbaoArte, Bilbao

Group exhibitions (selection) 

2000 Bären – Internationale Jugendbibliothek, Munich
 2014 Latin Beat Film Festival – T-Site Daikanyama, Tokyo, with Ana Juan and Alejandro Magallanes
2015 Imaginarius – Las Naves, Valencia, with Elena Odriozola and Julio Antonio Blasco
2017 Vidas ilustradas – València Capital Animal, Centre del Carme Cultura Contemporània, Valencia
2018 Los ilustrados de Ornamante – Ornamante Lab-Shop, Barcelona
2019 Milagros. Instituto Cervantes – Rome, with Ana Juan
2019 Milagros. Instituto Cervantes – Naples, with Ana Juan
2019 Almost Tales – Afnakafna palestra d’arte, Roma
2020 Tres tristes tigres – Galería Espacio 0, Huelva

Bibliography

 2000, Tío lobo (texts by Xosé Ballesteros), Kalandraka, Spain
 2001, El quadre més bonic del món (texts by Miquel Obiols), Kalandraka, Spain
 2003, En el mar de la imaginación (texts by Rafael Calatayud), Edelvives, Spain
 2003, El libro de las fábulas, Ediciones B, Spain
 2003, Las trenzas del abuelo (texts by Nuria Figueras), Kalandraka, Spain
 2004, Lazarillo de Tormes (text adaptation by Luis García Martín), Edelvives, Spain
 2005, Concierto para animales (texts by Andrés Valero Castells), Kalandraka, Spain
 2005, La cosa que más duele en el mundo (texts by Paco Liván), OQO, Spain
 2006, L’orquestra de la Clara (texts by Elisa Ramón), Baula, Spain
 2006, La cabra boba (texts by Pep Bruno), OQO, Spain
 2006, ¡Sígueme! (una historia de amor que no tiene nada de raro) (texts by José Campanari), OQO, Spain
 2007, The Thing that Hurts Most in the World (texts by Paco Liván, translation by Mark W. Heslop), OQO, Spain
 2007, The Silly Nanny Goat (texts by Pep Bruno, translation by Mark W. Heslop), OQO, Spain
 2007, Cleta, un regal del mar (texts by Joan Vila i Vila), Baula, Spain
 2007, Una pluma de cuervo blanco (texts by Pepe Maestro), Edelvives, Spain
 2007, La capra matta (texts by Pep Bruno, translation by Anna Barella Sciolette), #logosedizioni, Italy
 2007, La cosa che fa più male al mondo (texts by Paco Liván, translation by Fabio Regattin), #logosedizioni, Italy
 2008, Follow me! (A Love Story that isn’t Strange at All) (texts by José Campanari, translation by Mark W. Heslop), OQO, Spain
 2008, La Múnia dorm sota la manta (texts by Juan Krutz Igerabide), Animallibres, Spain
 2008, La llegenda de Sant Jordi (text adaptation by Josep Francesc Delgado), Baula, Spain
 2008, El cuadro más bonito del mundo (texts by Miquel Obiols), Kalandraka, Spain
 2008, Il quadro più bello del mondo (texts by Miquel Obiols, translation by Elena Rolla), Kalandraka, Italy
 2008, Sherlock Holmes y el caso de la joya azul (text adaptation by Rosa Moya), Lumen, Spain
 2008, La reina Victoria (texts by Lytton Strachey, translation by Silvia Pons Pradilla), Lumen, Spain
 2009, El príncep dels embolics (texts by Roberto Aliaga), Baula, Spain
 2009, El príncipe de los enredos (texts by Roberto Aliaga), Edelvives, Spain
 2009, Chevalier Auguste Dupin y la carta robada (text adaptation by Rosa Moya), Lumen, Spain
 2009, Las aventuras de Tom Sawyer (text adaptation by Rosa Moya), Lumen, Spain
 2009, La cara oculta de (la llegada del hombre a) la Luna (texts by Lewis York), Lumen, Spain
 2009, El Mosquito (texts by Margarita del Mazo), OQO, Spain
 2010, Un camaleón en la escuela de gatos (texts by Roberto Aliaga), Edebé, Spain
 2010, El gat de Montmartre (texts by Joseph Lluch), Estrella Polar, Spain
 2010, Entresombras y el circo ambulante (texts by Roberto Aliaga), Macmillan Education Iberia, Spain
 2010, Entresombras y la llave maestra (texts by Roberto Aliaga), Macmillan Education Iberia, Spain
 2010, Un cuento lleno de lobos (texts by Roberto Aliaga), OQO, Spain
 2010, Andrés cabeza abajo (texts by Pablo Albo), OQO, Spain
 2010, Mosquito (texts by Margarita del Mazo, translation by Mark W. Heslop), OQO, Spain
 2011, Superhéroes (texts by Roberto Aliaga), Anaya, Spain
 2011, El botó de Nacre (texts by Joan de Deu Prats), Baula, Spain
 2011, Roger Olmos. Catalogo, #logosedizioni, Italy
 2011, Besos que fueron y no fueron (texts by David Aceituno), Lumen, Spain
 2011, Entresombras y el viaje del fin… de curso (texts by Roberto Aliaga), Macmillan Education Iberia, Spain
 2012, A Chameleon in Cat School (texts by Roberto Aliaga), Edebé, Spain
 2012, Storia del bambino buono. Storia del bambino cattivo (texts by Mark Twain, translation by Valentina Vignoli), #logosedizioni, Italy
 2012, The Story of the Good Little Boy. The Story of the Bad Little Boy (texts by Mark Twain), #logosedizioni, Italy
 2012, Historia de un niño bueno. Historia de un niño malo (texts by Mark Twain, translation by Patricia Mayorga), #logosedizioni, Italy
 2012, Una storia piena di lupi (texts by Roberto Aliaga, translation by Antonella Lami), #logosedizioni, Italy
 2012, El rompecabezas (texts by Txabi and Manu Arnal Gil), OQO, Spain
 2012, Entresombras y la cabalgata macabra (texts by Roberto Aliaga), Macmillan Education Iberia, Spain
 2013, Diego en la Botella (texts by Mar Pavón), Edebé, Spain
 2013, Baci che furono e che non furono (texts by David Aceituno, translation by Antonella Fabbrini), Bulgarini, Italy
 2013, Pequeño catálogo de instantes de felicidad (texts by Lluis Llort), Lumen, Spain
 2014, Piccolo catalogo degli istanti di felicità (texts by Lluis Llort, translation by Antonella Fabbrini), Bulgarini, Italy
 2014, Tío lobo (texts by Xosé Ballesteros), Kalandraka, Spain
 2014, La màquina de Pessigolles (texts by Elisenda Queralt), la Galera, Spain
 2014, Senzaparole (translation by Valentina Vignoli), #logosedizioni, Italy
 2014, Senzaparole portfolio, #logosedizioni, Italy
 2014, Regálame un beso (texts by David Aceituno), Lumen, Spain
 2015, La leyenda de Zum (texts by Txabi Arnal), Nubeocho Ediciones, Spain
 2015, Calando, #logosedizioni, Italy
 2015, La leggenda di Zum (texts by Txabi Arnal, translation by Valentina Vignoli), #logosedizioni, Italy
 2015, Rompicapo (texts by Txabi and Manu Arnal Gil, translation by Valentina Vignoli), #logosedizioni, Italy
 2015, Seguimi! (una storia d’amore che non ha niente di strano) (texts by José Campanari, translation by Fabio Regattin), #logosedizioni, Italy
 2016, El detective Lucas Borsalino (texts by Juan Marsé), Alfaguara, Spain
 2016, Parque muerte (texts by Fernando Lalana), Edebé, Spain
 2016, Cosimo, #logosedizioni, Italy
 2017, El Mosquito (texts by Margarita del Mazo), Jaguar Ediciones, Spain
 2017, Amigos (translations by Francesca Del Moro, Federico Taibi, Valentina Vignoli), #logosedizioni, Italy
 2017, Stop, #logosedizioni, Italy
 2017, La Zanzara (texts by Margarita del Mazo, translation by Valentina Vignoli), #logosedizioni, Italy
 2017, Zak! Una zebra sopra le righe (texts by Cristina Nenna), Valentina edizioni, Italy
 2018, La vida de los monstruos (texts by David Aceituno), Astronave, Spain
 2018, Lucia (English translation by David Haughton), #logosedizioni, Italy
 2018, Lo struffallocero blu (texts by Ursula Wölfel, translation by Valentina Vignoli), #logosedizioni, Italy
 2019, Chester, el oso extraterrestre (texts by Raquel Garrido), Apila Ediciones, Spain
 2019, El libro de la mala suerte (texts by Edu Pez Bohó), Bonito Editorial, Spain
 2019, La foca bianca (texts by Rudyard Kipling, translation by Federico Taibi), #logosedizioni, Italy
 2019, Grindadráp (texts by Geert Vons, English translation by David Haughton), #logosedizioni, Italy
 2019, La foca bianca. Edizione speciale (texts by Rudyard Kipling, translation by Federico Taibi), #logosedizioni, Italy
 2020, 할수밖에없는말 (Senzaparole), Salon de l’Illustration, Korea
 2020, El abecedario de Nico y Arturo (texts by Ana López), A fin de cuentos, Spain
 2020, L’Isola del Tesoro (texts by Robert Louis Stevenson, translation by Alberto Frigo), #logosedizioni, Italy
 2020, Aquarium (texts by Geert Vons, English translation by David Haughton), #logosedizioni, Italy
 2020, Happy Meat, #logosedizioni, Italy
 2020, Taiji (texts by Geert Vons, English translation by David Haughton), #logosedizioni, Italy
 2021, L’Isola del Tesoro. Edizione speciale (texts by Robert Louis Stevenson, translation by Alberto Frigo), #logosedizioni, Italy
 2021, Amici per la pelle, #logosedizioni, Italy
 2021, Il richiamo della foresta (texts by Jack London, translation by Mirta Cimmino), #logosedizioni, Italy

Book covers 

 2007, Cuentos clásicos I, VV. AA., Pirueta, Spain
 2007, Cuentos clásicos II, VV.AA., Pirueta, Spain
 2008, Cuentos clásicos III, VV. AA., Pirueta, Spain
 2008, Cuentos clásicos IV, VV. AA., Pirueta, Spain
 2008, Minotauro. La batalla del laberinto, by Gabriel García de Oro, Ediciones B, Spain
 2009, Cuentos clásicos V, VV. AA., Pirueta, Spain
 2009, Minotauro. La torre del tiempo, by Gabriel García de Oro, Ediciones B, Spain
 2009, La última bruja de Trasmoz, by Cesar Fernandez García, la Galera, Spain
 2010, Haroun i el mar de les histories, by Salman Rushdie, Edicions Bromera, Spain
 2010, Luka i el foc de la vida, by Salman Rushdie, Edicions Bromera, Spain
 2010, Luzazul, by Carmen Fernández Villalba, la Galera, Spain
 2010, Cuentos clásicos VI, VV. AA., Pirueta, Spain
 2012, Parque muerte, by Fernando Lalana, Edebé, Spain
 2014, Cuentos clásicos de la literatura española, AA. VV., Edelvives, Spain
 2015, El universo para Ulises, by Juan Carlos Ortega, Planeta, Spain

CD covers 

 2006, Facto Delafé y las Flores Azules versus el monstruo de las Ramblas, by Facto Delafé y las Flores Azules,
 2007, En la luz de la mañana, by Facto Delafé y las Flores Azules
 2008, True Love, Là Par Force
 2011, Love Battle, CatPeople

References

External links

 

Spanish illustrators
1975 births
Living people
Veganism activists